The Caledonia Gladiators are a professional basketball club in Glasgow, Scotland. The Gladiators compete in the British Basketball League, the top tier of British basketball. Since 2012, the team have played their home games at the Emirates Arena in Glasgow. The team's traditional rivals are the Newcastle Eagles. The club was formed in 1998 as the Edinburgh Rocks, it was renamed to the Scottish Rocks in 2002, and the Glasgow Rocks in 2009. In 2022 it was announced they would be rebranded as the Caledonia Gladiators after a change in ownership.

Franchise history

Edinburgh Rocks
Established as the Edinburgh Rocks in 1998 by a consortium of businessmen, the team debuted at Meadowbank Arena under the helm of American coach Jim Brandon. Rocks were not the first Scottish team to compete in the British Basketball League (BBL), with both Murray Livingston and Glasgow Rangers making successful but short-lived appearances in the top-flight during the late 1980s. The franchise was admitted directly into the top-tier league to fill the slot opened up following the merging of Crystal Palace and London Towers. Despite being led by veteran coach Brandon, the team encountered a tough rookie season, finishing 9th in the 13 team league with a 12–24 record. Though finishing only one place off the Play-offs, Rocks were well adrift of 8th-placed Greater London Leopards, with a gap of 7 wins (14 points) between the two teams.

During the club's second season the Rocks effectively went bankrupt before being purchased by one of its existing directors, Ian Reid. Off-court problems did not detract much from the team's performance in the league, and the Rocks, bettered their inaugural season with a 19–17 record, finishing 3rd in the Northern Conference and qualifying for the postseason play-offs. They faced previous year's finalists Thames Valley Tigers in the Quarter-final, and despite a late rally, Rocks edged out their opponents to a 68–64 win, with American guard Ted Berry posting a team-high 16 points. Advancing on to the Semi-finals, the Scots came up against League champions and favourites Manchester Giants and despite trailing 52–28 at half-time, several incredible scoring runs from Rocks brought them to within 2 points of the Giants, with 2 minutes left. However, experience prevailed and the Giants held out for an 84–82 victory and advanced to the finals which they eventually won.

Edinburgh's third campaign saw coach Brandon move on and American coach Greg Lockridge take charge but he was fired after less than two months following a series of bust-ups with players and poor results. Scotland player Iain MacLean stepped up as player-coach but saw the side finish bottom of the Northern Conference, with a dismal 5–31 record and 1st round exits in the National Cup and the Trophy.

Scottish Rocks
In 2001–02 another American, Kevin Wall, was placed in charge and brought a mild turn in fortunes, finishing 4th (13–19). But it was another switch, in the summer of 2002, which proved more significant. Attracted by the opening of the brand-new 4,000-seat Braehead Arena in Glasgow, Rocks uprooted from their ageing Meadowbank venue in Edinburgh and moved 45-miles west to Scotland's largest city, and rebranded as the Scottish Rocks. The move received a mixed response from fans, whilst many said that the move wouldn't work, the official supporters club backed the franchise's decision.

While few fans followed the club west, the first season in Glasgow provided the franchise with a sponsorship deal with Mitsubishi and its most successful season to date, as coach Wall led the Rocks to their first ever trophy, the BBL Play-off Championship. Finishing 6th in the regular season standings, with a 22–18 record, the Rocks were outside shots at best to claim the Playoff title, but nail-biting victories against Chester Jets in the Quarter-final (94–98) and Sheffield Sharks in the Semi-final (74–76) propelled the Scots into a Final showdown with Brighton Bears at the National Indoor Arena (NIA) in Birmingham. The match was closely fought throughout, but Rocks’ Trinidadian star Shawn Myers put in an MVP performance with 26 points and hoisted the new-look club into the history books with a 76–83 victory.

Returning to the US, Wall's exit saw the arrival of former Brighton assistant Steve Swanson as the new head coach and on the back of the Play-off win, ushered in a new era for the franchise. With a 23–14 record, the Rocks finished the 2003–04 season in 4th place, the franchise's highest place finish in its short history, whilst also reaching the Semi-final of the Trophy and appearing as finalists in the inaugural BBL Cup, losing to Sheffield 70–83 in front of 6,000 people at Birmingham's NIA. The following season wasn't quite as successful during the regular season, but the team did manage to reach the Cup final again, losing out this time to coach Swanson's former team Brighton in a 90–74 defeat.

Sponsorship deals with local Honda dealer Phoenix and national newspaper the Daily Record saw the team named as the Scottish Phoenix Honda Record Rocks for the 2005–06 season and also saw the franchise reach its best ever league placing of second (29–11) and a further second place in the play-off final. Eliminating both Chester and Sheffield convincingly in the Quarter-final and Semi-final respectively, Rocks came up against their traditional arch-rivals Newcastle in the final in Birmingham, and though finishing only one victory (two points) behind the Eagles in the regular season, Rocks were brushed aside in the 83–68 loss. Following the loss, coach Swanson announced his departure, returning to US college basketball, and after three seasons at the club and a 0.614 winning average he left as the coach with the most wins record to date in Rocks' history.

The 2006–07 season saw the arrival of the British league's first ever German playcaller, Thorsten Leibenath. The German continued Rocks' winning ways, and took the team to another Cup final, losing out once more to Guildford 82–79, whilst a 4th-place finish and another appearance in the final of the play-off saw the seemingly annual rivalry with Eagles revived, Newcastle again triumphed in a 95–82 victory. On 30 April 2007, the Rocks announced Leibenath was leaving the club to take over head coaching duties at his previous club Giessen 46ers in Germany. Player, and BBL veteran Sterling Davis was named as his successor, assuming a player-coach role within the team. Davis' team performed amicably throughout the 2007–08 season, but a first round exit in the Trophy and a 5th-place finish in the league and a Quarter-final exit in the post-season Play-offs to eventual Runners-up Milton Keynes Lions, 105–93, meant the Rocks had failed to appear in a major Final for the first time in six years.

With the costs of Braehead Arena mounting, Rocks were finding difficulty in coming to an agreement with the venue owners over a new deal, forcing them to consider other options. Ultimately, the Rocks agreed a deal with the 1,200-capacity Kelvin Hall International Sports Arena, and although many fans considered it a downgrade, the clubs bosses were satisfied the move was helping the Rocks move forward. The move was announced on 16 July 2008, and would commence immediately, with a future plan to move into the new 6,500-capacity National Indoor Sports Arena in 2011.

The Rocks' first season at their new home would turn out to be a very turbulent one indeed. After an excellent start in the league campaign, they found themselves top of the table in January, however, a series of key injuries and a reported lack of harmony in the roster jeopardised their season. In the end, with an 18–15 record, the Rocks just managed to scrape a 7th-place finish and spot in the Play-offs, but again fell at the first hurdle, losing 84–64 to a dominating Everton Tigers side.

Glasgow Rocks

During the summer 2008 the franchise also announced a new long-term agreement with Glasgow City Council. As part of the agreement the Scottish Rocks would be renamed as the Glasgow Rocks from the start of the 2009–10 season.

In November 2009 it was announced that four Rocks players had caught swine flu, forcing the club to postpone a game with Guildford. All of the players made a full recovery.

The team reached the final of 2009–10 Playoffs, losing 80–72 to the Everton Tigers.

Continuing delays on construction of the new National Indoor Sports Arena meant the postponement of the scheduled move and the Rocks remaining at the Kelvin Hall for the 2011–12 season.

The Rocks moved into their new home at the National Indoor Sports Arena, known as the Emirates Arena for sponsorship reasons, in October 2012. The opening game in the arena was a derby match against Newcastle Eagles in front of a record 5,500 crowd, with the Eagles winning 102–84.

After a disappointing league season the Rocks reached the 2013–14 BBL Trophy Final, played at the Rocks' own Emirates Arena, where they lost out to the Worcester Wolves, 83–76. Captain EJ Harrison, who was plagued by injury for the second half of the season, also announced his retirement from the game.

The Rocks reached the 2014–15 BBL Cup Final, losing 84–71 to the Newcastle Eagles.

The Rocks set a club record 12-game winning streak during the early stages of the 2016–17 season, which would see the team reach the 2016–17 BBL Cup Final in Birmingham. The team lost out to rivals Newcastle, 91–83. Towards the end of the season, the club announced that the last remaining "original" shareholder of the club, Ian Reid, had sold his 50% share in the club to businessman Duncan Smillie. Following the end of the campaign, it was announced long term head coach Sterling Davis was to leave the club.

The Rocks reached the 2018–19 BBL Cup Final, losing 68–54 to the London Lions.

New ownerships and Gladiators rebrand 
In August 2022 Caledonia Basketball Holdings Ltd, a company owned by Steve and Alison Timoney, purchased 100% of shares in the Glasgow Rocks basketball team. They rebranded the team as Caledonia Gladiators starting from the 2022–23 season.

Home arenas
Meadowbank Arena (1998–2002)
Braehead Arena (2002–2008)
Kelvin Hall International Sports Arena (2008–2012)
Emirates Arena (2012–present)

Season-by-season records

Notes:
From 1999–2002 the BBL operated a Conference system. Rocks competed in the Northern Conference.
DNQ denotes Did Not Qualify.
NYP denotes Not Yet Played.

Silverware

Playoffs
 BBL Playoffs Winners: 2002–03 (1)

Players

Current roster

Notable former players

Retired numbers

Scottish Rockettes
The Scottish Rockettes are official dance team of the Glasgow Rocks. Amongst other events they also perform at BBL competition finals and home games for Glasgow Rugby.

The dance team is made up of 21 women who are all over 18 years of age from backgrounds as diverse as IT, nursing, finance, dance and sales. Each year the dance team train in the USA alongside the NBA and NFL dancers, learning material from the world's best choreographers.

Every year the team release a charity swimsuit calendar.

See also
Caledonia Gladiators (women)
British Basketball League
Scottish Basketball League

References

External links
Official Glasgow Rocks website
Glasgow Rocks on Facebook
Glasgow Rocks on Twitter
'Rolling Rocks' Supporters Club website
Glasgow Rocks news from The Glaswegian
Official Scottish Rockettes website, dance team of the Glasgow Rocks
The Cutlery Drawer, an unofficial Glasgow Rocks fan club

 
Basketball teams established in 1998
Basketball teams in Scotland
Sports teams in Glasgow
1998 establishments in Scotland
Sports teams in Edinburgh
Sport in Renfrewshire
British Basketball League teams